Ronald W. Bassett Jr. (born December 21, 1995) is an American professional stock car racing driver. He competes part-time in the NASCAR Xfinity Series, driving the No. 77 Chevrolet Camaro for his team, Bassett Racing. He and his family team also previously competed full-time in what is now the ARCA Menards Series East. He is the brother of Dillon Bassett, who also drives for and co-owns Bassett Racing.

Racing career

As part of his early racing career, Bassett raced Bandolero cars, Legends cars and late models, often competing against his brother Dillon.

In May 2016, a fire swept through the Bassett Racing shop, rendering most of the team's NASCAR K&N Pro Series East equipment unusable. Bassett found reprieve with Calabrese Motorsports, who offered Bassett a ride in the team's No. 43 for the next race.

In 2017, Bassett won his first career K&N Pro Series East race in the New Smyrna 175, showing strength in the late portions of the race. Throughout his time in the East Series, Ronnie would amass 67 starts (with all but two coming for his family team) and one win.

Bassett made his Xfinity Series debut at ISM Raceway in March 2019, driving the No. 90 Chevrolet for DGM Racing. He returned to the team for the race at Texas Motor Speedway, where Bassett scored a top-fifteen finish after having to start from the rear of the field.

On February 2, 2021, it was announced that the Bassett brothers had split from DGM Racing and would be restarting their family team, Bassett Racing, which would field the No. 77 Chevrolet Camaro full-time in the Xfinity Series that year. Ronnie and Dillon Bassett will share the car with the likely possibility of additional drivers also making starts in select races. DGM crew chief Nathan Kennedy also moved over with the Bassett brothers to their new team. However, the races that they attempted for Bassett Racing, they failed to qualify. So they moved back to DGM Racing. The only attempt that Bassett Racing has made was with Austin Dillon at the Pit Boss 250.

Personal life
Bassett's younger brother Dillon also competes in NASCAR. The two raced together for family-operated Bassett Racing in the NASCAR K&N series, owned by their father Ronnie Sr.

Motorsports career results

NASCAR
(key) (Bold – Pole position awarded by qualifying time. Italics – Pole position earned by points standings or practice time. * – Most laps led.)

Xfinity Series

K&N Pro Series East

K&N Pro Series West

 Season still in progress
 Ineligible for series points

References

External links
 

Living people
NASCAR drivers
1995 births
Sportspeople from Winston-Salem, North Carolina
Racing drivers from North Carolina